William Winston Kidd (born April 13, 1943) is a former World Cup alpine ski racer, a member of the U.S. Ski Team from 1962 to 1970.

At the 1964 Winter Olympics at Innsbruck, Kidd and teammate Jimmie Heuga became the first American men to win Olympic medals in alpine skiing, winning silver and bronze in the slalom. Six years later, Kidd won a gold medal in the combined and a bronze in the slalom at the 1970 World Championships in Val Gardena, Italy. He promptly switched circuits and enjoyed a successful pro ski racing career from 1970 to 1972, winning the World Pro Ski Tour World Championships in 1970, becoming the only racer in history to win FIS and Pro titles the same year.

Since 1970, Kidd has enjoyed enduring "legend" status in the sport, and he has remained in the public eye in his job as director of skiing at Steamboat Ski Resort in Colorado.

Early life 
Born in Burlington, Vermont, Kidd grew up in the 1950s in the ski town of Stowe, where his parents, Bill and Betty, ran the Buccaneer Motel. With encouragement and coaching from his father, and with support from the town of Stowe, he became a top junior ski racer at Stowe with the Mount Mansfield Ski Team. Along with best friend and skiing rival Jimmie Heuga, Kidd was named to the U.S. Ski Team for the 1962 season.

Ski racing 
Kidd made a name for himself that first season at age 18 with an eighth place in the slalom and a 15th place in the giant slalom (GS) at the 1962 World Championships in Chamonix, France. After enduring a season hampered by injuries, Kidd entered the 1964 season with high hopes and gritty determination. A silver medalist in the slalom at the 1964 Winter Olympics in Innsbruck, Kidd was the first American man (along with Heuga, who took bronze in the same race) to earn an Olympic medal in alpine skiing. Both Kidd and Heuga were just 20 years old at the time. Kidd finished seventh in the giant slalom and 16th in the downhill. Completing all three races kept him eligible for the combined, then a non-medal event in the Olympics (but a World Championship medal event), and he took third for the FIS bronze.

In the final non-World Cup season of 1966, Kidd won three crucial races in Europe and was actually outracing Jean-Claude Killy. Kidd suffered the first of two major injuries that almost ended his career, a left ankle sprain in late January, which resulted in a tendon operation. Later the same year, he broke his right tibia in two places during downhill training at the 1966 World Championships, held in August in Portillo, Chile. The injury also kept him out of the first World Cup season of 1967. During this injury time, he returned to college at the University of Colorado in Boulder.

The following year he took fifth in the giant slalom (GS) at the 1968 Winter Olympics in Grenoble, France. He took 15th in the downhill but did not finish the first run of the slalom, which was held in thick fog. Following those Olympics, he won a World Cup slalom in Aspen in March and finished 7th in the overall World Cup standings, the best from North America. For the 1968 World Cup season, Kidd finished in the top ten in all three events: 8th in giant slalom, 9th in downhill, and 10th in slalom. His first World Cup
victory came a month later at the Roch Cup slalom in Aspen, Colorado. His second win came a year later, also a slalom on U.S. snow at Squaw Valley, California.

At the 1970 World Championships in Val Gardena, Italy, Kidd won the gold medal in the combined and the bronze in the slalom. On winning the gold, he said, "I'd always promised my mom I'd bring home a gold medal." Following the conclusion of the World Championships in mid-February 1970, Kidd retired from the World Cup circuit, and immediately joined the new pro circuit, started by former U.S. Ski Team coach (and Kidd's and Heuga's University of Colorado ski coach) Bob Beattie. Kidd won the pro championship the same year, the only racer to hold world titles in the two circuits at once. Nagging injuries led to few starts during the 1972 season, and he retired from the pro circuit that fall.

Kidd graduated from the University of Colorado in 1969 with a B.S. degree in economics. Kidd's heritage is part Native American (Abenaki), and he is the honorary captain of the Native American Olympic Ski Team. In 2013, Kidd was inducted into the Vermont Sports Hall of Fame.

Steamboat Springs 

Kidd moved to Steamboat Springs, Colorado, in 1970, and ever since has been strongly identified with the Steamboat Ski & Resort Corporation, where he serves as its director of skiing. 2020 marked his 50th year on the job at Steamboat Ski Resort. As ambassador not just for Steamboat, but for the American West and the sport of skiing, Kidd is instantly recognizable by his Stetson  During ski season, skiers and snowboarders can join Kidd for a daily free, on-mountain clinic when he is in town, at 1 PM at the top of the Steamboat gondola. Those who "ski with Billy Kidd" down the Heavenly Daze intermediate run get ski tips, and learn about what it's like to ski in the Olympics.

At the invitation of Special Olympics founder Eunice Kennedy Shriver, Kidd served on the board of directors of Special Olympics International. He also served on the President's Council on Physical Fitness and on the board of the Jimmie Heuga Center (multiple sclerosis) in Vail. He regularly hosts Native American teens at Steamboat for annual "Future Olympians" weekends of skiing and snowboard instruction. Participants come mainly from the Ute reservation near Salt Lake City.

In the late 1980s, Kidd appeared in the award-winning American Express "Portraits" advertising campaign, photographed by Annie Leibovitz at his ranch near Steamboat. The campaign highlighted portraits of some of the most prominent people in the world, with the tagline "Achievers, visionaries, icons ... all with one thing in common." Besides Kidd, other AmEx card-carrying celebrities featured in the series included Ella Fitzgerald, Sofia Loren, Arnold Schwarzenegger, Tip O'Neill, Eric Heiden, Ray Charles, Willie Shoemaker, and Wilt Chamberlain.

Kidd hosts corporate ski outings for companies including American Express, Rolex, UPS, American Airlines, Time, and Sports Illustrated magazines, and several others.

World Cup results

Season standings

Results from the 1968 Winter Olympics and World Championships results were included in World Cup standings.

Race podiums
 2 wins – (2 SL)
 4 podiums, 19 top-ten finishes.

 ^ World Championships were also World Cup events in 1970

World Championship results 

From 1948 through 1980, the Winter Olympics were also the World Championships for alpine skiing.
At the World Championships from 1954 through 1980, the combined was a "paper race" using the results of the three events (DH, GS, SL).
 The 1966 championships were held in August in Chile; Kidd broke his leg during a downhill training run.

Olympic results

References

External links
 
 Billy Kidd World Cup standings at the International Ski Federation
 
 
 Billy Kidd at Colorado Ski Museum Hall of Fame
 Hall of Fame – 2006 inductees at VermontSkiMuseum.org
 Vermont Sports Hall of Fame Bio
 Sports Illustrated – 1964 Olympics – February 17, 1964 article
 Stars and Stripes – archives – February 9, 1964 – European edition
  – cover – March 8, 1965 – Billy Kidd
 A Bullet in the Rockies
  – cover – February 5, 1968 – 1968 Olympics preview – Billy Kidd & Jimmy Heuga
 A fight on the slopes, but a cinch on the ice

1943 births
Living people
Sportspeople from Burlington, Vermont
Abenaki people
American male alpine skiers
Alpine skiers at the 1964 Winter Olympics
Alpine skiers at the 1968 Winter Olympics
American people who self-identify as being of Native American descent
Sportspeople from Colorado
University of Colorado alumni
Medalists at the 1964 Winter Olympics
People from Steamboat Springs, Colorado
Olympic silver medalists for the United States in alpine skiing